CCAAT/enhancer-binding protein zeta is a protein that in humans is encoded by the CEBPZ gene.

Interactions 
CCAAT/enhancer binding protein zeta has been shown to interact with:
 NFYB, 
 P53, 
 P73

See also 
 Ccaat-enhancer-binding proteins

References

Further reading

External links 
 
 
 

Transcription factors